Stegasta is a genus of moths in the family Gelechiidae.

Species
Stegasta abdita Park & Omelko, 1994 (from Sibiria)
Stegasta allactis Meyrick, 1904 (from Australia)
Stegasta biniveipunctata (Walsingham, 1897) (from Grenada)
Stegasta bosqueella (Chambers, 1875) (from North America)
Stegasta capitella (Fabricius, 1794) (from the West Indies)
Stegasta comissata Meyrick, 1923 (from Brazil)
Stegasta cosmodes (Lower, 1899) (from Australia)
Stegasta francisci Landry, 2010 (from Galapagos)
Stegasta jejuensis Park & Omelko, 1994 (from Sibiria, Korea, Japan)
Stegasta postpallescens (Walsingham, 1897) (from the West Indies)
Stegasta sattleri Bidzilya & Mey, 2011 (from Congo, Ethiopia, Madagascar, Namibia, Tanzania, Zambia)
Stegasta scoteropis Meyrick, 1931 (from Brazil)
Stegasta tenebricosa Turner, 1919 (from Australia)
Stegasta variana Meyrick, 1904 (from Australia, southeast Asia, Africa)
Stegasta zygotoma Meyrick, 1917 (from Colombia, Ecuador and Peru)

References

Markku Savela's ftp.funet.fi
De Prins, J. & De Prins, W. 2015. Afromoths, online database of Afrotropical moth species (Lepidoptera). World Wide Web electronic publication (www.afromoths.net) (21-Mar-2015)

 
Gelechiini